Matthew J. Schneider  is an American attorney who served as the United States Attorney for the Eastern District of Michigan from 2018 to 2021. In 2021, he joined the law firm Honigman LLP as a partner.

Biography 

He earned his Bachelor of Arts from Michigan State University's James Madison College and his Juris Doctor from the University of Michigan Law School.

Schneider was a Senior Advisor and Assistant General Counsel in the Office of Management and Budget and an associate at Wiley Rein. From 2003 to 2011, he served as an Assistant United States Attorney in Detroit, where he prosecuted violent crime and public corruption cases. He has also served as Chief of Staff and General Counsel for the Michigan Supreme Court. He previously was Chief Deputy Attorney General for the State of Michigan, and Chief Legal Counsel for the Michigan Attorney General's office.

Beginning in 2012, Schneider has been an adjunct professor at Michigan State University Law School.

United States Attorney 

On January 5, 2018, he was appointed by United States Attorney General Jeff Sessions to serve as interim United States Attorney. On June 25, 2018, his nomination was sent to the United States Senate. On January 2, 2019, his nomination was confirmed by voice vote.

In April 2020, U.S. Attorney General William Barr appointed Schneider to lead the effort to examine state and local emergency restrictions that had been imposed in response to the COVID-19 pandemic.  Specifically he and his team were to identify where such restrictions unduly impinged upon "the constitutional rights and civil liberties of individual citizens."

On January 21, 2021, Schneider announced he would resign on February 1.

Personal life 
Schneider lives in Saline, Michigan, which is just west of Detroit. He is married to Rebecca Schneider and they have two children.

Notes and references

External links
Biography at Honigman LLP

Living people
21st-century American lawyers
Assistant United States Attorneys
Michigan lawyers
Michigan Republicans
Michigan State University alumni
United States Attorneys for the Eastern District of Michigan
United States Office of Management and Budget officials
University of Michigan Law School alumni
Year of birth missing (living people)